
Gmina Ciepielów  is a rural gmina (administrative district) in Lipsko County, Masovian Voivodeship, in east-central Poland.

Villages
Gmina Ciepielów contains the villages and settlements of Antoniów, Anusin, Bąkowa, Bielany, Borowiec, Chotyze, Ciepielów, Ciepielów-Kolonia, Czarnolas, Czerwona, Dąbrowa, Drezno, Gardzienice-Kolonia, Kałków, Kochanów, Kunegundów, Łaziska, Marianki, Nowy Kawęczyn, Pasieki, Pcin, Podgórze, Podolany, Ranachów B, Rekówka, Sajdy, Stare Gardzienice, Stary Ciepielów, Świesielice, Wielgie and Wólka Dąbrowska.

Neighbouring gminas
Gmina Ciepielów is bordered by the gminas of Chotcza, Iłża, Kazanów, Lipsko, Rzeczniów, Sienno and Zwoleń.

References
Polish official population figures 2006

Ciepielow
Lipsko County